George William Barker (8 August 1831 – 10 September 1869) was an English first-class cricketer and barrister.

The son of George Barker senior, he was born in August 1831 at Stanlake Park in Berkshire. He was educated at Rugby School, before going up to Christ Church, Oxford. After graduating from Oxford, Barker played first-class cricket for the Marylebone Cricket Club from 1854 to 1857, making four appearances: two in 1854 against Oxford University and Cambridge University, and two in 1857 against the same opponents. He scored 83 runs in these four matches, with a highest score of 31. A student of the Inner Temple, he was called to the bar in 1857. Barker died at Stanlake Park in September 1869, having been ill for ten days previous.

References

External links

1831 births
1869 deaths
People from Twyford, Berkshire
People educated at Rugby School
Alumni of Christ Church, Oxford
English cricketers
Marylebone Cricket Club cricketers
Members of the Inner Temple
English barristers